Shane Konings (born September 28, 1990) is a Canadian curler, originally from Gowanstown, Ontario.

Career

Mixed doubles
Konings won the 2020 Ontario Mixed Doubles Curling Championship with Lauren Wasylkiw, but did not compete at the 2020 Canadian Mixed Doubles Curling Championship, as it was cancelled due to the COVID-19 pandemic. As the 2021 Ontario provincial playdowns were cancelled due to the COVID-19 pandemic in Ontario, Wasylkiw and Konings were selected to represent Ontario at the 2021 Canadian Mixed Doubles Curling Championship in Calgary. At the championship, the pair finished with a 2–4 record, defeating Kim Tuck / Wayne Tuck Jr. and Bayly Scoffin / Wade Scoffin.

References

Living people
Canadian male curlers
Curlers from Ontario
1990 births
People from Perth County, Ontario
Wilfrid Laurier University alumni